"Whole Damn Nation" is Fear Zero's fourth studio album. It was released digitally in 2008 through Satch and Fontana North/Universal, with an expected CD release to follow sometime in 2009.
The CD was never released in stores but is still available at www.fearzero.com.

Track listing 

 "Whole Damn Nation" - 3:47
 "No Way To Die" - 3:27
 "Last Photograph" - 3:58
 "Breathe Again" - 3:54
 "Ledheart" - 4:01
 "Are You There" - 4:12
 "You Make Me Feel Like" - 3:46
 "Falling Down" - 4:04
 "Cry On A Sunday" - 3:52
 "Octane" - 1:29
 "Five Years Disappeared" - 3:53
 "Never Forget" - 3:54
 "California Calls" - 4:178

Credits 

Ed Sadler - Lead and background vocals, all guitars, bass, string arrangements
Francis Amanse - Drums, percussion, background vocals
Gerry Plant - Bass
Jason Dana - Drums
Randall Stoll - Drums
John Dean - Hammond B3 organ, piano, wurlitzer,
Darren Grahn - Percussion on all tracks
Shane Johnson - Synth, background vocals, string arrangements
Shawn Meehan - Background vocals
Ken Mason - Background vocals
Lorna Fortin - Cello
Nicole Scofield - Violin
Tony Bernal - Violin

Fear Zero albums
2008 albums